Horologica is a genus of minute sea snails, marine gastropod molluscs in the family Cerithiopsidae.

This genus was described by Laseron in 1956.

Species
Species in the genus Horologica include:

 Horologica abdita Cecalupo & Perugia, 2018
 Horologica acuta Cecalupo & Perugia, 2013
 Horologica affinis Cecalupo & Perugia, 2012
 Horologica albino Laseron, 1956
 Horologica alligata Cecalupo & Perugia, 2012
 Horologica alternata Cecalupo & Perugia, 2012
 Horologica amoena Cecalupo & Perugia, 2013
 Horologica anisocorda Jay & Drivas, 2002
 Horologica annagregis Cecalupo & Perugia, 2013
 Horologica arbastoi Cecalupo & Perugia, 2013
 Horologica balteata (Watson, 1881)
 Horologica barrieria Nützel, 1998
 Horologica bicolor Laseron, 1956
 Horologica bipartita Laseron, 1956
 Horologica camprinii Cecalupo & Perugia, 2014
 Horologica chaillei Cecalupo & Perugia, 2017
 Horologica clara Cecalupo & Perugia, 2012
 Horologica cowei Marshall, 1978
 Horologica diffusa Cecalupo & Perugia, 2012
 Horologica dirempta (Odhner, 1924)
 Horologica eolomitres (Melvill & Standen, 1896)
 Horologica faustinatoi Cecalupo & Perugia, 2014
 Horologica flava Cecalupo & Perugia, 2013
 Horologica forlii Cecalupo & Perugia, 2019
 Horologica fraudulenta Cecalupo & Perugia, 2013
 Horologica fuscocincta Cecalupo & Perugia, 2013
 Horologica gediceae Cecalupo & Perugia, 2014
 Horologica gilvocincta Cecalupo & Perugia, 2018
 Horologica glaubrechti Jay & Drivas, 2002
 Horologica gregaria Cecalupo & Perugia, 2012
 Horologica gwenaellae Cecalupo & Perugia, 2013
 Horologica gypsata Cecalupo & Perugia, 2012
 Horologica hombouyi Cecalupo & Perugia, 2017
 Horologica infuscata Cecalupo & Perugia, 2012
 Horologica interiecta Cecalupo & Perugia, 2016
 Horologica iucunda Cecalupo & Perugia, 2013
 Horologica jayi Cecalupo & Perugia, 2012
 Horologica konops Jay & Drivas, 2002
 Horologica lavanonoensis Cecalupo & Perugia, 2014
 Horologica lizardensis Nützel, 1998
 Horologica loyaltyensis Cecalupo & Perugia, 2017
 Horologica luculenta Cecalupo & Perugia, 2012
 Horologica macrocephala Laseron, 1956
 Horologica macrometrica Laseron, 1956
 Horologica magnifica Cecalupo & Perugia, 2012
 Horologica marianii Cecalupo & Perugia, 2012
 Horologica martini Jay & Drivas, 2002
 Horologica micaelae Cecalupo & Perugia, 2012
 Horologica minareta Laseron, 1956
 Horologica montii Cecalupo & Perugia, 2013
 Horologica musii Chen, Tseng & Lo, 2012
 Horologica niuginiensis Cecalupo & Perugia, 2018
 Horologica nodosa Cecalupo & Perugia, 2012
 Horologica passerina Chen, Tseng & Lo, 2012
 Horologica paupercula Cecalupo & Perugia, 2012
 Horologica pavesii Cecalupo & Perugia, 2012
 Horologica pinea (Hedley, 1909)
 Horologica pracchiai Cecalupo & Perugia, 2018
 Horologica prelleana Cecalupo & Perugia, 2012
 Horologica pupa (Dall & Simpson, 1901)
 Horologica purpurea Laseron, 1956
 Horologica rauli Rolán & Espinosa, 1992
 Horologica rinaldii Cecalupo & Perugia, 2013
 Horologica rubiginosa Cecalupo & Perugia, 2018
 Horologica rubrostriata Cecalupo & Perugia, 2013
 Horologica santoensis Cecalupo & Perugia, 2013
 Horologica segurinii Cecalupo & Perugia, 2012
 Horologica semipicta (Gould, 1861)
 Horologica siapoi Cecalupo & Perugia, 2017
 Horologica siazei Cecalupo & Perugia, 2017
 Horologica splendida Cecalupo & Perugia, 2012
 Horologica tabanellii Cecalupo & Perugia, 2012
 Horologica tabensis Cecalupo & Perugia, 2018
 Horologica taeniata Cecalupo & Perugia, 2013
 Horologica telegraphica (Hedley, 1909)
 Horologica teruyai Cecalupo & Perugia, 2019
 Horologica tsaoi Chen, Tseng & Lo, 2012
 † Horologica turpis Lozouet, 1999 
 Horologica turrigera (Watson, 1886)
 † Horologica violator (Laws, 1944) 
 Horologica virginieae Cecalupo & Perugia, 2012
 Horologica westiana (Hedley, 1909)
 Horologica yabobensis Cecalupo & Perugia, 2018

Taxon inquirendum
 Horologica aeolomitres (Melvill & Standen, 1896) 
Species brought into synonymy
 Horologica cubensis Rolán & Espinosa, 1992: synonym of Belonimorphis cubensis (Rolán & Espinosa, 1992) (original combination)
 Horologica pulchella (C. B. Adams, 1850): synonym of Horologica pupa (Dall & Simpson, 1901)

References

 Laseron C.F. (1956). The family Cerithiopsidae (Mollusca) from the Solanderian and Dampierian zoogeographical provinces. Australian Journal of Marine and Freshwater Research. 7(1): 151–182.
 Rolán, E. & Espinosa, J. 1992., La familia Cerithiopsidae H. y A. Adams, 1853 (Mollusca, Gastropoda), en la Isla de Cuba. 2. El genero Horologica Laseron 1956; Publicações ocasionais da Sociedade Portuguesa de Malacologia.16: 45-50 ... Catálogo do Museo de Historia
 Cecalupo A. & Perugia I. (2012) Family Cerithiopsidae H. Adams & A. Adams, 1853 in the central Philippines (Caenogastropoda: Triphoroidea). Quaderni della Civica Stazione Idrobiologica di Milano 30: 1-262

External links

 Marshall B. (1978). Cerithiopsidae of New Zealand, and a provisional classification of the family. New Zealand Journal of Zoology 5(1): 47-120

Cerithiopsidae